Cheilosia rita  the inky blacklet, is a fairly common species of syrphid fly observed in The United States and Canada. Hoverflies can remain nearly motionless in flight. The adults are also known as flower flies for they are commonly found on flowers, from which they get both energy-giving nectar and protein-rich pollen. The larvae, when they are known, are plant feeders.

References

Diptera of North America
Hoverflies of North America
Eristalinae
Insects described in 1922
Taxa named by Charles Howard Curran